Emory S. Harris (March 24, 1858 - December 17, 1926) was a Vermont public official. A Democrat, among the offices in which he served were member of the Vermont House of Representatives (1898-1900) and United States Marshal for Vermont (1894-1898).

Biography
Emory Stearns Harris was born in Hoosick, New York on March 24, 1858, a son of Ebenezer Stearns Harris (1834-1880) and Elizabeth B. (Rudd) Harris (1825-1902). Harris moved to Bennington, Vermont in 1876. He was a graduate of North Bennington High School and graduated from Troy (New York) Business College in 1877.

Harris was active in a variety of enterprises, including owning and operating a farm. His other ventures included undertaker, furniture sales, cigar store owner, and insurance agent. His professional and civic memberships included the Odd Fellows, Elks, Improved Order of Red Men, Bennington Board of Trade, and Bennington County Fish and Game Club.

A Democrat, Harris was chairman of the Vermont Democratic Party from 1900 to 1914. He served in several local offices including town lister, justice of the peace and member of the board of selectmen, and president of the village board of trustees. A Democrat in an era when the Republican Party dominated Vermont politics, Harris was an unsuccessful candidate for several offices, including judge of probate (1888) and lieutenant governor (1900).

From 1885 to 1889, Harris was Deputy U.S. Marshal for Vermont, serving under Marshal John Robinson. In 1894, Harris was appointed United States Marshal for Vermont, succeeding Rollin Amsden. He served until 1898, and was succeeded by Fred A. Field. From 1898 to 1900, Harris represented Bennington in the Vermont House of Representatives.

After serving as US Marshal, Harris owned and operated the Green Mountain Detective Agency, a private investigative service. He served as Bennington's postmaster from 1914 to 1923.

Death and burial
Harris died in Bennington on December 17, 1926. He was buried at Bennington Old Cemetery in Bennington.

Family
In 1881, Harris married Addie S. Warren (1862-1937). They were married until his death and had no children.

References

Sources

Books

Newspapers

Internet

External links

1858 births
1926 deaths
People from Hoosick, New York
People from Bennington, Vermont
Democratic Party members of the Vermont House of Representatives
United States Marshals
Vermont postmasters
Burials in Vermont